Willemijn J.I. Waal (b. 1975 to Cornelis Jan Dirk Waal and Iris Schuddebeurs) is a Dutch Hittitologist and Classicist. She is known especially for her work on Hittite administrative practice and the development of early scripts, including Luwian hieroglyphic and the Greek alphabet.

Having taught at various universities, including the Ludwig Maximilian Universität München and the VU University Amsterdam, she currently is an assistant professor at Leiden University and (from 1 January 2020 onwards) director of the Netherlands Institute for the Near East.

Waal received various grants for her research, including fellowships from Cambridge University's CREWS project, the Institute of Aegean Prehistory and the Swiss Foundation Luwian Studies.

Her doctoral thesis was published in 2015 as Hittite Diplomatics: Studies in Ancient Document Format and Record Management.

She is co-editor, along with Jorrit M. Kelder, of From 'Lugal.Gal' to 'Wanax': kingship and political organisation in the Late Bronze Age Aegean, a work discussing Hittite evidence for the nature of Myceanaen Greek society.

References

1975 births
Living people
Hittitologists
Academic staff of Leiden University
Academic staff of the Ludwig Maximilian University of Munich
Academic staff of Vrije Universiteit Amsterdam